Illinois Centennial Memorial Column, Logan Square Monument or Illinois Centennial Monument is a public monument in the Logan Square community area and the Chicago Landmark and National Register of Historic Places-listed Logan Square Boulevards Historic District. Reliefs surrounding the base depict figures of Native Americans, explorers, farmers and laborers intended to show the great changes experienced during the state's 1st century. Although Bacon designed the main column, Evelyn Beatrice Longman designed and sculpted the reliefs.

It is located at North Milwaukee Avenue and Logan Boulevard in the public square known as Logan Square. The monument is cased in Tennessee marble. The column is composed of 13 solid marble segments and is based on the same proportions and scale as the columns that make up the colonnade of the Parthenon in Greece.  The column is opposed by a flagpole and a concrete plaque dedicated to American soldiers who died in World War I, World War II and the Korean War. The monument was funded by the Benjamin Ferguson Fund.  Daniel Boone, Hiawatha and Ceres are among those depicted in the base.

In 1997 the Chicago Department of Transportation planted 81 trees around the column including hackberry, Patmore green ash, Skyline honeylocust, red oak, swamp white oak, alpine currant, Virginia Rose and three varieties of hawthorns: downy, Washington and thornless cockspur.

Notes

External links
Logan Square Preservation website

Buildings and structures in Chicago